Nushi is an Albanian surname. Notable people with the surname include:

 Gogo Nushi (1913–1970), Albanian politician
 Kristian Nushi (born 1982), Kosovar Albanian footballer
 Pajazit Nushi  (1933-2015), Albanian psychologist

See also
 Nushi Tulliu (1872–1941), Aromanian poet
 Nishi (surname)

Albanian-language surnames